Section 20 of the Indian Penal Code is about courts of justice. The section states:

References

Sections of the Indian Penal Code